Christoforos Nezer (1903 – 1995) was a Greek actor and brother of Marika Nezer.

He was descended from the Bavarian Nezer family, which came to Greece with King Otto. He took part in several movies under the director Theodoros Angelopoulos.

Filmography

External links

Christoforos at 90lepta

1903 births
1995 deaths
Greek people of Bavarian descent
Male actors from Athens
20th-century Greek male actors

el:Χριστόφορος Νέζερ (ξάδερφος)